Robert H. Goddard (1882–1945) was an American scientist and pioneer of modern rocketry.

Robert Goddard may also refer to:

Robert Goddard, witness in a trial after the Boston Massacre (1770)
Robert Goddard (novelist) (born 1954), British novelist
Robert Hale Ives Goddard (1837–1916), American businessman and politician from Rhode Island 
Robert Hale Ives Goddard III (born 1941), American anthropologist and linguist
Sir Robert Victor Goddard (1897–1987), British Royal Air Force officer